Zenobios is a Greek masculine given name. Feminine form: Zenobia. Zenobius in Latin, Zanobi in Italian, Zinobi/Zinobiy (Зенобий) in Bulgarian, Zinovi/Zinoviy in Russian (as well as the surname Zinovyev), and Zenob in Armenian, derive from it. 

The name may refer to:

Zenobius ( 86 BC), Pontic general in the First Mithridatic War
Zenobius, Greek 2nd-century sophist
Zenobius, Greek 4nd-century rhetorician, teacher of Libanius
Saint Zenobius of Florence (337–417)
Hieromartyrs Zenobios and Zenobia

Greek masculine given names